Christian Claudio, (born on 17 June 1973 in San Juan, Puerto Rico) was a two-time member of the Puerto Rican national taekwondo Olympic team.

Although born in Puerto Rico, Christian Claudio was raised in Oklahoma, where he attended Putnam City High School and then University of Oklahoma, where he was a member of the Sigma Phi Epsilon fraternity, and from where he graduated in 1995. He was Oklahoma State Taekwondo Champion in the Middle or Heavy weight division from 1988 until 1994.  Christian also was on the Puerto Rican National Olympic Team as an alternate for 1996 Games in Atlanta and was the team Heavy Weight for the 2000 Olympic Games in Sydney, Australia.  Unfortunately, Christian was forced to resign from the team due to injury and retired from International Competition soon after.

Currently, Christian Claudio is the Director of the Physical Therapy and Sports Performance Practice at Kaye/Bassman International.  He was named Kaye/Bassman’s Rookie of the Year in 2009.  Furthermore, he completed the year as the highest billing non-partner consultant within the organization.  Christian is one of the most sought after retained consultant for the nation's leading Healthcare Systems and Sports Performance Facilities.
 
He currently resides in McKinney, Texas with his wife and his two children.

References

External links
ChristianClaudio.com company website
Kaye/Bassman 2009 Rookie of the Year: Christian Claudio
Christian Claudio profile on Naymz.com

1973 births
Living people
American motivational speakers
American motivational writers
American self-help writers
People from McKinney, Texas
Life coaches
Sportspeople from San Juan, Puerto Rico